Chulaki or Chuleki, also rendered as Chaliki, may refer to:
 Chulaki (31°48′ N 49°52′ E), Izeh
 Chulaki (31°51′ N 50°01′ E), Izeh

See also
 Chaliki
 Chulak (disambiguation)